The second edition of the football tournament at the Pan American Games was held in Mexico City, Mexico, from March 13 to March 22, 1955. Four teams competed, with Argentina defending the title.

Argentina won its second consecutive gold medal after totalising 11 points in 6 matches. Estadio Olímpico Universitario was the venue for all the games.

Final table

Matches

Medalists

Goalscorers

Bibliography 
  .

References 

1
Events at the 1955 Pan American Games
1
1
1